Alfredo de Freitas Dias Gomes (19 October 1922 – 18 May 1999) was a Brazilian playwright.

He was born on October 19, 1922 in Salvador, Bahia. He started writing plays at age 15 and later wrote soap operas. He wrote the first ever colored soap opera in Brazilian television, and the one with the highest rating of all time. He was also a writer of numerous Brazilian TV shows, miniseries, and a few movies. Keeper of Promises was the first ever Brazilian movie to be nominated for an Oscar, and the only South American to ever win the Golden Palm in Cannes. In 1950 he married Brazilian telenovelist Janete Clair and in their 33 years of marriage they had three children. She died in 1983 and six years later he remarried, to Bernadeth Lyzio. With her he had two daughters, Mayra Dias Gomes, a writer, and Luana Dias Gomes, a student of Economics at Stanford University.  He died in a car accident in São Paulo, in 1999.

Main works

Keeper of Promises
A Revolução dos Beatos
O Santo Inquérito
O Bem Amado
O Rei de Ramos
Roque Santeiro
A Ponte dos Suspiros
Verão Vermelho
Assim na Terra como no Céu
Bandeira 2
O Espigão
Saramandaia
Sinal de Alerta
Expresso Brasil
Mandala
Araponga
As Noivas de Copacabana
Irmãos Coragem
Decadência
Fim do Mundo

External links

1922 births
1999 deaths
Brazilian male writers
People from Salvador, Bahia
Authors of Brazilian telenovelas
Road incident deaths in Brazil
Male television writers
20th-century screenwriters